Wayne Richard Presley (born March 23, 1965) is an American former professional ice hockey right winger who played 12 seasons in the National Hockey League from 1984–85 until 1995–96.

Biography
Presley was born in Dearborn, Michigan and raised in Taylor, Michigan. As a youth, he played in the 1978 Quebec International Pee-Wee Hockey Tournament with a minor ice hockey team from Detroit.

Presley was drafted 39th by the Chicago Black Hawks in the 1983 NHL Entry Draft. His best statistical season was the 1986–87 NHL season, when he scored 32 goals and 61 points. He also scored five shorthanded goals in consecutive years, 1993–94 and 1994–95. He played 684 career NHL games, scoring 155 goals and 147 assists for 302 points.

Presley also represented the United States at the 1987 Canada Cup.

Career statistics

Regular season and playoffs

International

References

External links

1965 births
Living people
American men's ice hockey right wingers
Buffalo Sabres players
Chicago Blackhawks draft picks
Chicago Blackhawks players
Ice hockey players from Michigan
Kitchener Rangers players
New York Rangers players
People from Taylor, Michigan
San Jose Sharks players
Sault Ste. Marie Greyhounds players
Sportspeople from Dearborn, Michigan
Sportspeople from Wheaton, Illinois
Toronto Maple Leafs players